The MDW Tri-State Heavyweight Championship is a professional wrestling secondary championship in Mason-Dixon Wrestling (MDW). It was the original television title of the Atlantic Coast Championship Wrestling promotion during its first year of operation. In December 1998, the promotion became Mason-Dixon Wrestling and the title was replaced by the MDW Tri-State Heavyweight Championship.

The inaugural champion was "Freebird" Buddy Rose, who defeated Bart Batten in New Martinsville, West Virginia on September 20, 1997 to become the first ACCW Television Champion. Latin Tornado, Chick Scott, and Mason Hunter are tied for the record of most reigns, with two each. At 399 days, Punchy McGee's first reign is the longest in the title's history. Tony Nardo's only reign was the shortest in the history of the title, lasting less than a day, losing the belt to Latin Tornado on the same night it was awarded to him. Overall, there have been 21 reigns shared between 15 wrestlers, with one vacancy.

Title history
Key

Names

Reigns

List of combined reigns

Footnotes

References
General

Specific

External links

MDW Tri-State Heavyweight Title at Cagematch.de
MDW Heavyweight Championship at USA Indy Wrestling

Mason-Dixon Wrestling championships
Heavyweight wrestling championships
United States regional professional wrestling championships